Carlskrona IF is a floorball club in Karlskrona, Sweden, established in 1988. The men's team played in the Swedish top division during the 1990s and won a bronze medal at the Swedish national championship playoffs during the 1992-1993 and 1993-1994 seasons.

References

1988 establishments in Sweden
Sport in Blekinge County
Sports clubs established in 1988
Swedish floorball teams